Alexander Georgiev Barov (1931 in Razlog – 1999) was an eminent Bulgarian architect.

Principal works
 National Palace of Culture, Sofia (1978) 
 Universiada Hall, Sofia (1961)
 Accra Sports Stadium, Ghana (1961)
 Bulgarian Embassy in Moscow (1977)
 City Hall, Ruse
 Boyana Residence (1974)—the former prime-ministerial residence in Sofia, which is now Bulgaria's National Historical Museum

References

Bulgarian architects
1931 births
1999 deaths
People from Razlog
20th-century Bulgarian architects